Seabed Constructor is a multipurpose offshore vessel owned by Swire Seabed and contracted since December 2016 to British-owned hydrographic survey company Ocean Infinity, based in Houston, Texas, United States. Previously known as Olympic Athene and originally Olympic Boa, the ship was launched in 2013 and is flagged in Norway. The ship is designed to conduct geophysical and geotechnical surveys of the seabed, support the construction or demolition of underwater structures, conduct trenching and excavation operations, and serve as a ROV platform for the company's autonomous underwater vehicles and unmanned surface vehicles.

Seabed Constructor participated in the search for Malaysia Airlines Flight 370. It was operated by Ocean Infinity on a 90-day search contract for the missing aircraft; the mission ended unsuccessfully in mid-June 2018.

Seabed Constructor was then contracted by the Argentine Navy to search for the missing submarine ARA San Juan. On 17 November 2018, Seabed Constructor found San Juan a year and two days after the submarine's disappearance.

References

2013 ships
Ships of Norway
Vessels involved in the search for Malaysia Airlines Flight 370